James Howard Harris, 3rd Earl of Malmesbury, GCB, PC (25 March 1807 – 17 May 1889), styled Viscount FitzHarris from 1820 to 1841, was a British statesman of the Victorian era.

Background and education
James Howard Harris was born on 25 March 1807 in London, the eldest son and heir of James Harris, 2nd Earl of Malmesbury, and his wife, Harriet Susan Dashwood, daughter of Francis Bateman Dashwood, of Well Vale, Lincolnshire, and his wife, Teresa March, daughter of John March, of Willeslet Park, Cambridgeshire. Having been educated privately, he went to Eton College, a Public school, and Oriel College, Oxford, graduating from the latter in 1828 with a Bachelor of Arts degree. In the years that followed his graduation, he went travelling around Europe and making acquaintance with aristocratic circles, becoming familiar with Prince Louis Napoleon, who would later become Napoleon III of France.

Family
Harris married, firstly, on 13 May 1876, Lady Corisande Emma Bennet, daughter of Charles Augustus Bennet, 5th Earl of Tankerville, and his wife Corisanda, daughter of Antoine, duc de Gramont and sister of Agenor, duc de Gramont, who was Minister of Foreign Affairs for France in 1870. She died in 1876. After the death of his first wife, Malmesbury married a second time, on 1 November 1880, to Susan Hamilton, daughter of John Hamilton of Fyne Court, Somerset.

Political career
In 1841 he had only just been elected to the House of Commons for Wilton as a Conservative, when his father died and he succeeded to the peerage. Malmesbury served as Foreign Secretary under the Earl of Derby in 1852 and again from 1858 to 1859 and was also Lord Privy Seal under Derby and Benjamin Disraeli between 1866 and 1868 and under Disraeli between 1874 and 1876. In 1852 he was admitted to the Privy Council. He was regarded as an influential Tory of the old school in the House of Lords at a time when Lord Derby and Disraeli were, in their different ways, moulding the Conservatism of the period.

In his two brief terms as foreign secretary, Malmesbury pursued a cautious, Conservative policy. His friendship with the exiled Louis Napoleon helped lead to quick British acquiescence in the Prince-President's decision to restore the Empire in 1852, but did not prevent Malmesbury from pursuing a policy relatively sympathetic to Austria during the crisis leading up to the Italian War of 1859. Malmesbury was particularly horrified by the behaviour of Cavour, and at the fact that a small country like Piedmont was able so easily to threaten the European peace.

His long life, and the publication of his Memoirs of an Ex-Minister in 1884, contributed to his reputation. The Memoirs, charmingly written, full of anecdote, and containing much interesting material for the history of the time, remain his chief title to remembrance. Lord Malmesbury also edited his grandfather's Diaries and Correspondence (1844), and in 1870 published The First Lord Malmesbury and His Friends.

Personal life
Lord Malmesbury died childless in May 1889, aged 82, and was succeeded in the earldom by his nephew, Edward Harris.

References

Citations

Bibliography 

Kidd, Charles, Williamson, David (editors). Debrett's Peerage and Baronetage (1990 edition). New York: St Martin's Press, 1990.

External links 

 

1807 births
1889 deaths
British Secretaries of State for Foreign Affairs
Lords Privy Seal
Knights Grand Cross of the Order of the Bath
Members of the Privy Council of the United Kingdom
British Secretaries of State
Leaders of the Conservative Party (UK)
3
Alumni of Oriel College, Oxford
People educated at Eton College
Members of the Parliament of the United Kingdom for English constituencies
UK MPs 1841–1847
UK MPs who inherited peerages
Leaders of the House of Lords